Molecular Biology and Evolution is a monthly peer-reviewed scientific journal published by Oxford University Press on behalf of the Society for Molecular Biology and Evolution. It publishes work in the intersection of molecular biology and evolutionary biology. The founding editors-in-chief were Walter Fitch and Masatoshi Nei; the present editor-in-chief is Sudhir Kumar.

According to the Journal Citation Reports, the journal has a 2017 Impact Factor of 10.217, a 2018 Impact Factor of 14.797, a 2019 Impact Factor of 11.062, and a 2021 Impact Factor of 8.800

References

External links 

Molecular and cellular biology journals
Evolutionary biology journals
English-language journals
Monthly journals
Oxford University Press academic journals
Academic journals associated with learned and professional societies